Beatrice Egli (born 21 June 1988) is a Swiss pop and Schlager singer. She is the winner of season 10 of the German music competition Deutschland sucht den Superstar. Egli became the second contestant from Switzerland to win the title after another Swiss person, Luca Hänni, won the previous season of the series. She has sold over 1,000,000 records in Germany, Switzerland and Austria.

Early life and career
Egli comes from an Austrian-Swiss butcher family and has been singing since the age of nine. At 14, she began taking singing lessons and singing at folk festivals. In 2007, Egli joined up with Lys Assia, an established artist, and together they released the album Sag mir wo wohnen die Engel, with title track from the album becoming an official single. In April 2007, they took part in the Grand Prix der Volksmusik (a Grand Prix contest for folk music) reaching Final 16 in August 2007 and finishing 12th. In 2009, she performed at Musikantenstadl, a live television entertainment program broadcast throughout Austria, Germany, and Switzerland and featuring popular folk and Schlager music with the song "Lippenstift". She eventually trained as a hairdresser for a brief time, and in 2011, entered the acting school Schule für Schauspiel Hamburg before applying to Deutschland sucht den Superstar in 2013.

Performances during DSDS

After DSDS

After her win, she released "Mein Herz" as her winning song. The single topped the German, Swiss and Austrian Singles Chart. Following the success, she released her album Glücksgefühle which topped the Swiss Albums Chart and made it to number 2 in both Germany and Austria. In 2013, she also engaged in a Glücksgefühle Tour to promote the album.

On 24 October 2014, she published her new studio album Bis hierher und viel weiter, which was recorded in Berlin, without the cooperation of Dieter Bohlen. The first single was Auf die Plätze, fertig, ins Glück, and the video was filmed in New York City. From early November, Egli staged her Pure-Lebensfreude tour. The album reached number one in Switzerland again. The next single from the album was Wir leben laut, and the Video was from her Tour through Germany, Switzerland and Austria. On Easter Sunday, April 5, Beatrice Egli moderated the ZDF show "Beatrice Egli – A Spring Day in Rome".

In the summer of 2015 and 2016 Beatrice Egli ran her own show called Die große Show der Träume on ARD and SRF. But due to low ratings, the program was dropped after just two episodes.

Her album, "Kick im Augenblick", was released on 8 April 2016. It comprises 19 tracks including a medley of songs from her previous album, Bis hierher und viel weiter. In addition, she is taking in many television appearances and hosting some programs on ZDF, MDR and SRF since then.

Her most recent album, Wohlfühlgarantie was released on 16 March 2018. It holds 21 tracks, with the final track, Alperose, sung in her native Swiss German. To promote the album before its release, she released four tracks: Herz an, Keiner küsst mich, Mein Ein und Alles, and Verliebt, verlobt, verflixt nochmal. Herz an and Verliebt, verlobt, verflixt nochmal were also released along with their respective music videos. Wohlfühlgarantie Tour will begin in October 2018 and continue until December 2018.

Discography

Studio albums
 Sag mir wo wohnen die Engel (2007)
 Wenn der Himmel es so will (2008)
 Feuer und Flamme (2011)
 Glücksgefühle (2013)
 Pure Lebensfreude (2013)
 Bis hierher und viel weiter (2014)
 Kick im Augenblick (2016)
 Wohlfühlgarantie (2018)
 Natürlich! (2019)
 Mini Schwiiz, mini Heimat (2020)

Awards

Echo 
 2014: for Newcomer des Jahres (international)

Prix Walo 
 2014: for Schlager

Swiss Music Awards
 2015: Best Female Solo Act
 2017: Best Female Solo Act
 2021: Best Female Solo Act

References

21st-century Swiss women singers
1988 births
Living people
Deutschland sucht den Superstar winners
People from the canton of Bern